Stephen R. Brown is a television producer who is best known for producing game shows and reality television.

Brown has worked on numerous shows in association with Stone Stanley Entertainment, including Fun House, Shop 'til You Drop, Legends of the Hidden Temple, and The Mole.  Brown has also executive-produced Law & Order, The Wire, and How Much Is Enough?, as well as many episodes of The Sopranos final season.

In 1995, Brown was noted as Executive Producer for Legends of the Hidden Temple, winner of the CableACE Award for Best Game Show Special or Series.

References

External links

Living people
American television producers
Year of birth missing (living people)